Sophie of Winzenburg (1105 in Winzenburg, near Hanover – 6 or 7 July 1160 in Brandenburg an der Havel) was the first Margravine of Brandenburg.

Life
Sophie was a daughter of Count Herman I of Winzenburg and his first wife, who was a Countess of Everstein. She donated an oxgang of farmland near Wellen to the monastery at Leitzkau and later another oxgang near Wolmirsleben. In 1158, she accompanied her husband on a pilgrimage to the Holy Land.

Death
Her sister, Beatrix, was abbess of Quedlinburg Abbey. Sophie and Beatrix both died in 1160. Some sources suggest that Sophie died on 25 March, other name 6 or 7 July. She was buried in the church of the monastery in Ballenstedt.

Criticism 
The present state of research is that the identity of her father has not been conclusively proven. She may have belonged to another noble house in which the name Sophie was used.

Image 
Seven hundred years after her death, a bracteate depicting Sophie and her husband was found in Aschersleben. Her portrait is stylized, as was usual in that period. The fact that Albert depicted his wife beside him on coins is a sign of his extraordinary love for Sophie.

Marriage and issue 
In 1125, she married Albert the Bear. She had a dozen children with him. Of these children, Bernhard lived the longest, viz. until 1212.
 Otto I, Margrave of Brandenburg (1126/1128 – 7 March 1184)
 Count Herman I of Orlamünde (died 1176)
 Siegfried (died 24 October 1184), Bishop of Brandenburg from 1173 to 1180, Prince-Archbishop of Bremen, the first ranked prince, from 1180 to 1184
 Heinrich (died 1185), a canon in Magdeburg
 Count Adalbert of Ballenstedt (died after 6 December 1172)
 Count Dietrich of Werben (died after 5 September 1183)
 Count Bernhard of Anhalt (1140 – 9 February 1212), Count of Anhalt, and from 1180 also Duke of Saxony as Bernard III
 Hedwig (d. 1203), married to Otto II, Margrave of Meissen
 Daughter, married  to Vladislav of Olomouc, the eldest son of Soběslav I, Duke of Bohemia
 Adelheid (died 1162), a nun in Lamspringe
 Gertrude, married in 1155 to Duke Děpold I of Jamnitz
 Sybille (died c. 1170), Abbess of Quedlinburg
 Eilika

Footnotes

References
 Otto Dungern: Thronfolgerecht und Blutsverwandtschaft der deutschen Kaiser seit Karl dem Großen, Papiermühle, Vogt, 1910, p. 159
 Bettina Elpers: Regieren, Erziehen, Bewahren: mütterliche Regentschaften im Hochmittelalter, Klostermann, Frankfurt am Main, 2003, p. 152

External links
 Genealogical data for Sophie
 Genealogical data for Sophie and incomplete data for her children

1105 births
1160 deaths
Margravines of Brandenburg
12th-century German nobility
12th-century German women